Lee Chae-won (formerly Lee Chun-ja; born 7 April 1981 in Pyeongchang, Gangwon) is a South Korean cross country skier who has competed since 1999. Competing in six Winter Olympics, she earned her best finish of 21st in the team sprint event at PyeongChang in 2018.

Lee's best finish at the FIS Nordic World Ski Championships was 49th in the 10 km event at Oberstdorf in 2005.

Her best World Cup finish was 15th in a relay event in Sweden in 2008 while her best individual finish was 43rd in a 15 km mass start event at France that same year.

References

External links
 
 

1981 births
Cross-country skiers at the 2002 Winter Olympics
Cross-country skiers at the 2006 Winter Olympics
Cross-country skiers at the 2010 Winter Olympics
Cross-country skiers at the 2014 Winter Olympics
Cross-country skiers at the 2018 Winter Olympics
Cross-country skiers at the 2022 Winter Olympics
Living people
Olympic cross-country skiers of South Korea
South Korean female cross-country skiers
Sportspeople from Gangwon Province, South Korea
Asian Games medalists in cross-country skiing
Cross-country skiers at the 1999 Asian Winter Games
Cross-country skiers at the 2003 Asian Winter Games
Cross-country skiers at the 2007 Asian Winter Games
Cross-country skiers at the 2011 Asian Winter Games
Cross-country skiers at the 2017 Asian Winter Games
Asian Games gold medalists for South Korea
Asian Games silver medalists for South Korea
Asian Games bronze medalists for South Korea
Medalists at the 2011 Asian Winter Games
Medalists at the 2017 Asian Winter Games
Competitors at the 2001 Winter Universiade
Competitors at the 2005 Winter Universiade